Achille is a French and Italian masculine given name, derived from the Greek mythological hero Achilles. It may refer to:

People

Artists 
 Achille Beltrame (1871–1945), Italian painter
 Achille Calici (c. 1565–?), Italian painter
 Achille Castiglioni (1918–2002), Italian designer
 Achille Cattaneo (1872–1931), Italian painter
 Achille Devéria (1800–1857), French painter and lithographer
 Achille Duchêne (1866–1947), French garden designer
 Achille Empéraire (1829–1898), French painter
 Achille Formis (1832–1906), Italian painter
 Achille Funi (1890–1972), Italian painter
 Achille Glisenti (1848–1906), Italian painter
 Achille Granchi-Taylor (1857–1921), French painter and illustrator
 Achille Lega (1899–1934), Italian painter
 Achille Leonardi (c. 1800–1870), Italian painter
 Achille Locatelli (painter) (1864–1948), Italian painter
 Achille Mauzan ((1883–1952), French illustrator, painter and sculptor
 Achille Etna Michallon (1796–1822), French painter
 Achille Mollica (1832–1885), Italian painter
 Achille Peretti (artist) (1857–1923), Italian painter, sculptor and anarchist
 Achille Petrocelli (1861/62–1896), Italian painter
 Achille Pinelli (1809–1841), Italian painter
 Achille Solari (1835–1884), Italian painter
 Achille Valois (1785–1862), French designer and sculptor
 Achille Vertunni (1826–1897), Italian painter
 Achille Vianelli (1803–1894), Italian painter
 Achille Zo (1826–1901), French painter

Musicians, composers and singers 
 Achille Baquet (1885–1955/1956), American jazz clarinetist and saxophonist
 Achille De Bassini (1819–1881), Italian baritone
 Achille Campisiano (1837–1908), French pianist and composer
 Achille Rivarde (1865–1940), American-born British violinist and teacher
 Achille Simonetti (1857–1928), Italian violinist and composer

Politicians 
 Achille Le Tonnelier de Breteuil (1781–1864), French politician
 Achille Casanova (1941–2016), Swiss journalist and politician
 Achille Corona (1914–1979), Italian socialist politician, lawyer and journalist
 Achille Joseph Delamare (1790–1873), French senator
 Achille Larue (1849–1922), Canadian lawyer and politician
 Achille Occhetto (born 1936), Italian politician
 Achille Peretti (1911–1983), French politician
 Achille Serra (politician) (born 1941), Italian politician
 Achille Starace (1889–1945), Italian fascist leader before and during World War II

Religious figures 
 Achille Grassi (1456–1523), Italian Roman Catholic bishop and cardinal
 Achille Gagliardi (1537–1607), Italian ascetic writer and Jesuit
 Achille Glorieux (1910–1999), French Catholic prelate, archbishop and diplomat
 Achille Harlay de Sancy (1581–1646), French diplomat, linguist, orientalist and Catholic bishop
 Achille Liénart (1884–1973), French Catholic cardinal and bishop
 Achille d'Étampes de Valençay (1593–1646), French military leader, a Knight of Malta and Catholic cardinal

Scientists and mathematicians 
 Achille Allier (1807–1836), French archaeologist, writer and art critic
 Achille Costa (1823–1899), Italian entomologist
 Achille Ernest Oscar Joseph Delesse (1817–1881), French geologist and mineralogist
 Achille Pierre Dionis du Séjour (1734–1794), French astronomer and mathematician
 Achille Marie Gaston Floquet (1847–1920), French mathematician
 Achille Gerste (1854–1920), Belgian Catholic priest, Jesuit, philologist and linguist
 Achille Guenée (1809–1880), French entomologist and lawyer
 Achille Loria (1857–1943), Italian Jewish political economist and sociologist
 A. E. Meeussen (1912–1978), Belgian philologist
 Achille Müntz (1846–1917), French agricultural chemist
 Achille Ouy (1889–1959), French philosopher and sociologist
 Achille Urbain (1884–1957), French biologist
 Achille Valenciennes (1794–1865), French zoologist

Sportsmen 
 Achille Anani (born 1994), Ivorian footballer playing in France
 Achille Campion (born 1990), French footballer
 Achille Compagnoni (1914–2009), Italian mountaineer and skier
 Achille Coser (born 1982), Italian football goalkeeper
 Achille Emaná (born 1982), Cameroonian footballer
 Achille Fould (bobsleigh) (1919–1949), French bobsledder
 Achille Varzi (1904–1948), Italian Grand Prix race car driver

Other 
 Achille Ballière (1840–1905), French architect
 Achille Boitel (died 1944), French businessman and Nazi collaborator
 Achille Jubinal (1810–1875), French medievalist
 Achille Leclère (1785–1853), French architect and teacher of architecture
 Achille Majeroni (1881–1964), Italian film actor
 Achille Maramotti (1927–2005), Italian fashion designer and founder of Max Mara, an Italian fashion company
 Achille Marozzo (1484–1553), Italian fencing master
 Achille Mbembe (born 1957), Cameroonian philosopher and political theorist
 Achille Millien (1838–1927), French poet and folklorist
 Achille Millo, stage name of Italian actor, voice actor and stage director Achille Scognamillo (1922–2006)
 Prince Achille Murat (1801–1847), eldest son of Joachim Murat
 Achille St. Onge (1913–1978), American publisher of miniature books
 Achille Zavatta (1915–1993), French clown, artist and circus operator

Fictional characters 
 Achille Poirot, the "brother" of Agatha Christie's detective Hercule Poirot (actually Hercule in disguise) in the novel The Big Four
 the title character of Achille Talon, a comic book series
 the title character of Achille in Sciro, a 1737 opera
 Rodrigue Achille Fraldarius, a character in Fire Emblem: Three Houses

See also 
 Achilles (disambiguation)

References 

Italian masculine given names
French masculine given names